"Forget About Me" is a song written by Frankie Miller, Troy Seals and Eddie Setser, and recorded by American country music duo The Bellamy Brothers.  It was released in June 1984 as the first single from the album Restless.  The song reached number 5 on the Billboard Hot Country Singles & Tracks chart.

Chart performance

References

1984 singles
The Bellamy Brothers songs
Songs written by Troy Seals
Songs written by Frankie Miller
MCA Records singles
Curb Records singles
Songs written by Eddie Setser
1984 songs